The FIBA Oceania Championship for Women 1978 was the qualifying tournament of FIBA Oceania for the 1979 FIBA World Championship for Women. Australia won the series 3-0 to win its second consecutive Oceania Championship.

Results

Championship

References
FIBA Archive

FIBA Oceania Championship
Championship
1978 in New Zealand basketball
1978 in Australian basketball
International basketball competitions hosted by New Zealand
Australia women's national basketball team games
New Zealand women's national basketball team games
1978 in New Zealand women's sport
1978 in Australian women's sport